The 1942 Arizona gubernatorial election took place on November 3, 1942. Incumbent Governor Sidney Preston Osborn ran for reelection, and easily defeated a challenge from former Governor Robert Taylor Jones in the Democratic primary, who Osborn also defeated in 1940.

In a virtually identical race to 1940, Sidney Preston Osborn defeated Jerrie W. Lee in the general election, and was sworn into his second term as Governor on January 5, 1943.

Democratic primary
The Democratic primary took place on September 8, 1942. Incumbent Governor Sidney Preston Osborn ran for reelection, and defeated former Governor Robert Taylor Jones in the primary. Osborn previously ran against Jones in 1938 and 1940, losing to Jones the first time, and beating him the second time. Daniel C. McKinney, a cattle rancher, also presented a significant challenge to Osborn.

Candidates
 Sidney Preston Osborn, incumbent Governor
 Robert Taylor Jones, former Governor
 Daniel C. McKinney, cattle rancher
 Ernest Carleton

Results

Republican primary

Candidates
 Jerrie W. Lee, 1938, 1940 Republican gubernatorial nominee

General election

References

1942
1942 United States gubernatorial elections
Gubernatorial
November 1942 events